The Opening of the World Series is a trilogy of novels by Harry Turtledove set in a fantasy world.

In the trilogy, the Raumsdalian Empire is the dominant political entity, which shares ties to a loose collection of barbarian tribes with a common ethnicity, known as the Bizogots. The known world had always been bounded on the north by a massive glacier, but at the beginning of the series it has melted through, allowing contact with lands to the north. The series details the exploration of these northern lands and combat with the people who live there, an aggressive race of fierce warriors and powerful sorcerers known as the Rulers.

List of novels
 Beyond the Gap (2007)
 The Breath of God (2008)
 The Golden Shrine (2009)

References

Fantasy novel series
Novels by Harry Turtledove